, sometimes , is a Korean concept signifying the subtle art and ability to listen and gauge others' moods. In Western culture,  could be described as the concept of emotional intelligence. It is of central importance to the dynamics of interpersonal relationships.  is literally translated as "eye-measure".  is closely related to the broader concept of paralanguage but also relies on an understanding of one's status relative to the person with whom they are interacting. It can be seen as the embodiment of skills necessary to communicate effectively in high context culture.

 is briefly defined as the high social sensitivity of Koreans that basically means they are able to ascertain others' moods by being around them and talking to them. They are sensitive to what others say indirectly, because they want to maintain harmony. They sense someone's , a Korean word that relates to mood, current feelings, and the state of mind. Facilitating , encouraging the use of this skill, is expected to result in rich understanding. It is of central importance to the dynamics of interpersonal relationships. With , Koreans are using nonverbal cues to convey emotion and meaning through various means, including voice pitch and volume as well as intonation. Because Korea, as with other high-context cultures, caters toward in-groups that have similar experiences and expectations and from which inferences are drawn, many things are left unsaid. The culture does the explaining, in effect.

In Korea, personal relations frequently take precedence over business. In order to be successful, it is vital to establish good, personal relationships based on mutual trust and benefit. Korean business culture is firmly grounded in respectful rapport and in order to establish this, it is essential to have the right introduction to approach the company. Koreans will use  to make sure the right approach is being used, often through a mutual friend or acquaintance at the appropriate level. Koreans spend a significant amount of time developing and fostering personal contacts. Therefore, time should be allocated for this process, particularly during the first meeting, which is frequently used to simply establish rapport and build trust.  
  
The phrase  refers to someone who is quick-witted, can understand the situation quickly, or has common sense.

See also
Korean language
Tacit knowledge

References

External links

Interpersonal relationships